Macroglossum sitiene, the crisp-banded hummingbird hawkmoth, is a moth of the family Sphingidae described by Francis Walker in 1856.

Distribution 
It is known from Sri Lanka, eastern India, Bangladesh, Myanmar, Thailand, southern China, Taiwan, southern Japan (the Ryukyu Archipelago), Vietnam, Peninsular Malaysia and Sumatra, Indonesia.

Description
The wingspan is 46–56 mm. The thorax is olive green. Forewings are without any reddish tinge; the antemedial band is filled in black and recurved along the inner margin. The first two postmedial lines are more angled below the costa. There is a black subapical streak and spot on the terminal segment of the abdomen which is strongly developed. A yellow band can be seen on the hindwings. The ventral side has three transverse lines on each hindwing. The larva is polymorphic, with both green and brown forms. The horn is long and slightly curved upwards. The head and thorax of the pupa are dull greenish grey, and the rest of the body is brownish grey.

Ecology
Adults are attracted to Duranta erecta and Lantana camara blossoms. They prefer flowers low down on bushes, and fly very close to the ground when approaching.

Larvae have been recorded feeding on Paederia scandens in Hong Kong, Morinda umbellata and Paederia tomentosa farther north in China and mainly Morinda citridora in Thailand.

References

Macroglossum
Moths described in 1856
Moths of Asia
Moths of Japan
Moths of Sri Lanka
Moths of Taiwan